The Vengeance of Durand is a 1919 American silent drama film directed by Tom Terriss and starring Alice Joyce, Gustav von Seyffertitz and Percy Marmont. It was a remake of an earlier short film of the same title made by Vitagraph Studios.

Cast
 Alice Joyce as Marion Durand / Beatrice Durand
 Gustav von Seyffertitz as Henri Durand
 Percy Marmont as Tom Franklin
 William Bechtel as Armand La Farge
 Eugene Strong as Captain St. Croix Trouvier
 H.H. Pattee as Theophile 
 Mark Smith as 'Tubby' Livingston

References

Bibliography
 Phillips, Alastair & Vincendeau, Ginette. Journeys of Desire: European Actors in Hollywood. British Film Institute, 2006.

External links
 

1919 films
1919 drama films
1910s English-language films
American silent feature films
Silent American drama films
American black-and-white films
Films directed by Tom Terriss
Vitagraph Studios films
1910s American films